Thibault Tassin de Montaigu (born 21 December 1978 in Boulogne-Billancourt) is a French writer and journalist.

Biography 
Thibault de Montaigu was born on 21 December 1978 in Boulogne-Billancourt to Françoise Gallimard and Emmanuel Tassin de Montaigu. He is the maternal grandson of Simone Gallimard and Claude Gallimard. His maternal great-grandfather, Gaston Gallimard, was a founder of Nouvelle Revue Française and the founder of Éditions Gallimard. His father's family are members of the French nobility. He began his career at Libération in 2003 with the culture and guide services. Since then, he has collaborated on numerous publications (L'Officiel, l'Officiel Voyages, l'Optimum, Madame Figaro, Paris Match...).

He wrote five novels noticed by the critics which were selected in particular for the prix de Flore and the prix Interallié.

In 2011, he was curator of the exhibition "La Parisienne" at the Galerie des Galeries, which brought together many artists (Catherine Millet, Bertrand Burgalat, Stanislas Merhar  etc.) around the fictional apartment of a Parisienne.

He is married to designer and fashion stylist Sofia Achaval de Montaigu, with whom he has two children.

Works 
2003: Les anges brûlent, éditions Fayard, 
2007: Un jeune homme triste, Fayard, 
2010: Les Grands Gestes la nuit, Fayard, 
2013: Zanzibar, Fayard, 
2015: Voyage autour de mon sexe, éditions Grasset and Fasquelle,

References

External links 
 Je me fais l’amour, pas vous ? on Le Monde (6 May 2015)
 Thibault de Montaigu on On n'est pas couché (30 May 2015)
 Thibault de Montaigu : Voyage autour de mon sexe on France Info
 Thibault de Montaigu lit un extrait de son livre Zanzibar on YouTube

21st-century French writers
21st-century French journalists
Lycée Henri-IV alumni
Sciences Po alumni
People from Boulogne-Billancourt
1978 births
Living people
French nobility